The NAIA sponsored a women's gymnastics championship between 1981 and 1988, when it was discontinued. The rise of Division III gymnastics thru the NCAA made the need for the NAIA organization less thus its fade out.

Results

Team competition

Individual events

All-around
 1981	Kim Buron, Adams State CO
 1982	Stacey Aberle, Minot State ND
 1983	Cindy Greer, Tarleton State TX
 1984	Cindy Greer, Tarleton State TX
 1985	Jean Schuler, Winona State MN
 1986	Mary Leivian, Wisconsin-Oshkosh
 1987	Mary Leivian, Wisconsin-Oshkosh
 1988	Mary Leivian, Wisconsin-Oshkosh

Vaulting
 1981	Kim Buron, Adams State CO
 1982	Stacey Aberle, Minot State ND
 1983	Cindy Greer, Tarleton State TX
 1984	Margot Todd Evans, Centenary LA
 1985	Renae Newman, Minot State ND
 1986	Mary Leivian, Wisconsin-Oshkosh
 1987	Jill McCall, Centenary LA
 1988	Renae Newman, Minot State ND

Uneven bars
 1981	Kim Buron, Adams State CO
 1982	Greta Sjursen, Minot State ND
 1983	Cindy Greer, Tarleton State TX
 1984	Cindy Greer, Tarleton State TX
 1985	Sylvia Ponce-Sawyer, Winona State MN
 1986	Mary Leivian, Wisconsin-Oshkosh
 1987	Mary Leivian, Wisconsin-Oshkosh
 1988	Melissa Thomas, Georgia College

Balance beam
 1981	Lisa Haugen, Gustavus Adolphus MN
 1982	Janelle Tucker, Georgia College
 1983	Meg Miderier, Clarion PA
 1984	Cindy Greer, Tarleton State TX
 1985	Sylvia Ponce-Sawyer, Winona State MN
 1986	Robin Wheeler, Minot State ND
 1987	Mary Leivian, Wisconsin-Oshkosh
 1988	Nicole Lastrapes, Centenary LA

Floor exercise
 1981	Nan Johnson, Gustavus Adolphus MN
 1982	Janelle Tucker, Georgia College and Kim Villers, Southern Colorado
 1983	Cindy Greer, Tarleton State TX
 1984	Margot Todd Evans, Centenary LA
 1985	Jean Schuler, Winona State MN
 1986	Katie Dempsey, Winona State MN
 1987	Katie Dempsey, Winona State MN
 1988	Mary Leivian, Wisconsin-Oshkosh

Summary

Individual titles

See also
NCAA Women's Gymnastics Championships
NCAA Division II Women's Gymnastics Championships

References

External links

G
College women's gymnastics in the United States
gym NAIA national women's gym
1980s establishments in the United States
1980s disestablishments in the United States
1980s in gymnastics